She Came to Stay (French, L'Invitée) is a novel written by French author Simone de Beauvoir first published in 1943. The novel is a fictional account of her and Jean-Paul Sartre's relationship with Olga Kosakiewicz and Wanda Kosakiewicz.

Plot
Set in Paris on the eve of and during World War II, the novel revolves around Françoise, whose open relationship with her partner Pierre becomes strained when they form a ménage à trois with her younger friend Xaviere. The novel explores many existentialist concepts such as freedom, angst, and the other.

Characters
 Françoise – considered to be Simone de Beauvoir
 Pierre – considered to be Jean-Paul Sartre
 Xaviere – considered to be a character combining elements of both Olga and Wanda Kosakiewicz

See also
The Mandarins
The Second Sex
Jean-Paul Sartre

1943 French novels
Novels by Simone de Beauvoir
French autobiographical novels
Existentialist novels
Novels set in Paris
1943 debut novels